Ricko Saputra (born 21 January 2000) is an Indonesian weightlifter. He won the gold medal in the men's 61kg event at the 2021 Islamic Solidarity Games held in Konya, Turkey.

He won the bronze medal in the men's 61kg event at the 2022 Asian Weightlifting Championships held in Manama, Bahrain.

References

External links 
 

Living people
2000 births
Place of birth missing (living people)
Indonesian male weightlifters
Islamic Solidarity Games medalists in weightlifting
Islamic Solidarity Games competitors for Indonesia
21st-century Indonesian people